The 2022–23 season is the 109th season in the existence of NK Osijek and the club's 32nd consecutive season in the top flight of Croatian football. In addition to the domestic league, Osijek are participating in this season's edition of the Croatian Cup and the UEFA Europa Conference League.

Players

Transfers

In

Out

 Total Spending: €0

 Total Income: €6,150,000

 Net Income: €6,150,000

Competitions

Overall record

SuperSport HNL

League table

Results summary

Results by round

Matches

Croatian Cup

UEFA Europa Conference League

Second qualifying round

Friendlies

Pre-season

On-season

Mid-season

Player seasonal records
Updated 18 March 2023

Goals

Source: Competitive matches

Clean sheets

Source: Competitive matches

Disciplinary record

Appearances and goals

Notes

References

External links

NK Osijek seasons
Croatian football clubs 2022–23 season
2022–23 UEFA Europa Conference League participants seasons